Scopula francki is a moth of the family Geometridae. It was described by Prout in 1935. It is found in south-western China.

References

Moths described in 1935
francki
Moths of Asia
Taxa named by Louis Beethoven Prout